Peter E. Nathan (born April 18, 1935) was an acting President of the University of Iowa, serving in 1995.  Prior to that, he served as Provost of the University of Iowa from 1993 to 1995.  Nathan received his B.A. in Social Relations from Harvard College in 1957 and his Ph.D. in Clinical Psychology from Washington University in St. Louis in 1962. Nathan has been The University of Iowa Foundation Distinguished Professor of Psychology at the university since 1990.

References

Presidents of the University of Iowa
1935 births
Living people
Harvard College alumni
Washington University in St. Louis alumni